Dragiša Brašovan (Serbian Cyrillic: Драгиша Брашован; May 25, 1887 – October 6, 1965) was a Serbian modernist architect, one of the leading architects of the early 20th century in Yugoslavia.

Works 

Barcelona
 Serbian, Croatian and Slovene Pavilion for the 1929 Barcelona International Exposition. Was with the Barcelona Pavilion of Mies van der Rohe and the Swedish Pavilion of Peder Clason the only examples of avant-garde architecture. The building, demolished after the exposition, had the shape of an irregular star and the façade had no ornamental elements as the other historicist pavilions.

Belgrade:
 The Museum of Nikola Tesla building, 1932.
 The State Printing building (later BIGZ building), 1934-1941.
 Command of the Air Force Zemun, 1939.
 Hotel Metropol, 1953.
 Several buildings built in the 1930s (Francuska no. 5, Liberation Blvd. No.2, Boulevard of Despot Stefan no. 8, etc.).

Jagodina:
 Apartment blocks of Cable Factory Svetozarevo (FX), built in the late 1950s

Novi Sad:
 Workers' Association, 1931.
 Banovina building, (now the Executive Council of Vojvodina), 1939.
 Main Post Office, 1961.

Orlovat:
 Church of the Presentation of Mary, 1924-1927.

Zrenjanin:
 Serbian bank building, about 1920th
 Sokolski dom, 1927.
 Begej Vila, 1926.

Čortanovci:
 Stanković Vila, 1930.

Čačak:
 "Partizan" departement store, 1963

Gallery

See also
 List of Serbian painters
 Momir Korunović
 Milan Antonović
 Dragutin Dragiša Milutinović

References

External links

Further Biography and Work Overview

1887 births
1965 deaths
People from Vršac
20th-century Serbian architects